Tectus is a genus of sea snails, marine gastropod mollusks in the family Tegulidae.

Description
The shell has a pyramidal shape. Its base is flat, without false-umbilicus. The rhomboidal aperture is very oblique, angular, and wider than long. The outer lip is lirate within. The columella is very short, vertical, with a strong spiral fold, ending anteriorly in a knob or point.

Distribution
This marine genus has a wide distribution. It occurs in the Persian Gulf, the Red Sea, in the Central and East Indian Ocean and off East Africa, Oceania, Indo-China, Indo-Malaysia, the Philippines,  East India, Australia (New South Wales, Northern Territory, Queensland, Western Australia), Kermadec Islands, New Caledonia, Anadaman Islands.

Species
Species within the genus Tectus include:
 † Tectus altavillensis (Defrance, 1828) 
 Tectus architectonicus A. Adams, 1853
 † Tectus athenasi (Vasseur, 1882) 
 † Tectus aulacophorus (Cossmann & Pissarro, 1905) 
 † Tectus bareti (Vasseur, 1882) 
 † Tectus bourdoti (Cossmann & Pissarro, 1902) 
 † Tectus branderi (Defrance, 1828) 
 † Tectus britannus (Vasseur, 1882) 
 † Tectus chavani Glibert, 1962 
 † Tectus chenui Le Renard, 1994 
 † Tectus cognatus (J. de C. Sowerby, 1840) 
 † Tectus crenularis (Lamarck, 1804) 
 Tectus (Tectus) dentatus (Forskål in Niebuhr, 1775)
 † Tectus extraconicus Gain, Belliard & Le Renard, 2019 
 Tectus fabrei (Montrouzier in Fischer, 1878)
 Tectus fenestratus (Gmelin, 1791)
 † Tectus fluctus Gain, Belliard & Le Renard, 2019 
 † Tectus fredevillensis Gain, Belliard & Le Renard, 2019 
 † Tectus funiculosus (Deshayes, 1832) 
 † Tectus gabrielis (d'Orbigny, 1850) 
 † Tectus gervillii Gain, Belliard & Le Renard, 2019 
 † Tectus leae Gain, Belliard & Le Renard, 2019 
 † Tectus margaritaceus (Deshayes, 1832) 
 Tectus mauritianus (Gmelin, 1791)
 † Tectus monilifer (Lamarck, 1804) 
 † Tectus montissanctipetri (Binkhorst, 1861) 
 † Tectus morgani (Cossmann & Pissarro, 1905) 
 Tectus noduliferus'' (Lamarck, 1822)
 † Tectus ornatus (Lamarck, 1804) 
 † Tectus planibasis Gain, Belliard & Le Renard, 2019
 Tectus pyramis (Born, 1778)
 † Tectus richardi Gain, Belliard & Le Renard, 2019 
 Tectus royanus (Iredale, 1912)
 † Tectus spinalis Gain, Belliard & Le Renard, 2019 
 † Tectus subcanaliculatus (Deshayes, 1863) 
 † Tectus torticostulus Gain, Belliard & Le Renard, 2019 
 Tectus triserialis (Lamarck, 1822)

Species brought into synonymy 
 Tectus concavus (Gmelin, 1791): synonym of Infundibulum concavum (Gmelin, 1791)
 Tectus conus (Gmelin, 1791): synonym of Rochia conus (Gmelin, 1791)
 Tectus elatus (Lamarck, 1822): synonym of Rochia elata (Lamarck, 1822)
 Tectus magnificus Poppe, 2004: synonym of Rochia magnifica (Poppe, 2004)
 Tectus maximus (Koch in Philippi, 1844): synonym of Rochia maxima (Koch, 1844)
 Tectus niloticus (Linnaeus, 1767): synonym of Rochia nilotica (Linnaeus, 1767)
 Tectus pagodalis Montfort, 1810: synonym of Tectus mauritianus (Gmelin, 1791)
 Tectus tentorium (Gmelin, 1791): synonym of Trochus tentorium Gmelin, 1791
 Tectus tabidus Reeve, L.A., 1861: synonym of Tectus pyramis (Born, 1778)
 Tectus virgatus (Gmelin, 1791): synonym of Rochia virgata (Gmelin, 1791)

References

 Vaught, K.C. (1989). A classification of the living Mollusca. American Malacologists: Melbourne, FL (USA). . XII, 195 pp
 Williams S.T., Karube S. & Ozawa T. (2008) Molecular systematics of Vetigastropoda: Trochidae, Turbinidae and Trochoidea redefined''. Zoologica Scripta 37: 483–506

External links
 Montfort P. (Denys de). (1808-1810). Conchyliologie systématique et classification méthodique des coquilles. Paris: Schoell. Vol. 1: pp. lxxxvii + 409 [1808]. Vol. 2: pp. 676 + 16
 Schumacher, C. F. (1817). Essai d'un nouveau système des habitations des vers testacés. Schultz, Copenghagen. iv + 288 pp., 22 pls.
 Swainson, W. (1840). A treatise on malacology or shells and shell-fish. London, Longman. viii + 419 pp

 
Tegulidae
Gastropod genera